IBGA may refer to

 Ball grid array - Interstitial Ball Grid Array (IBGA) is a type of Ball Grid Array (BGA). Redirected to main article.
 International Blind Golf Association - A governing organization of Blind golf associations around the world.